Fan Expo Chicago (formerly Wizard World Chicago Comic Con, and commonly known as the Chicago Comicon), is a comic book convention held during the summer in Rosemont, Illinois, United States, at the Donald E. Stephens Convention Center. It was traditionally a three-day event (Friday through Sunday), but in 2006, it expanded to four days (Thursday through Sunday). It was founded in 1972 as Nostalgia '72, Chicago Comic Con and later as the Chicago Comic and Nostalgia Convention by a local dealer (and school teacher) named Nancy Warner.

Acquired by Wizard Entertainment in 1997, and Informa's Fan Expo unit in 2021, Fan Expo Chicago is among the larger comic book conventions in the United States, in third place for overall attendance at a single event. 

Originally showcasing comic books and related popular arts, the convention has expanded over the years to include a larger range of pop culture elements, such as professional wrestling, science fiction/fantasy, film and television, horror, animation, anime, manga, toys, collectible card games, video games, webcomics, and fantasy novels. From 1995 to 2006, it was also the home of the Wizard World Fan Awards.

History
Chicago collectibles dealer Nancy Warner staged the area's first comic and collectibles convention on July 22–23, 1972, calling it Nostalgia '72, Chicago Comic Con. It attracted 2,000 attendees. She ran the show, which featured movie screenings, as well as dealers from as far as Los Angeles, Atlanta, Buffalo, New York, and Oklahoma City. In fact, in 1973 a rival show, called "Chicago Comic Con", produced by Mark Lully of the Atlantis Bookstore, was held at the Midland Hotel; guests included Stan Lee, Jim Steranko, and Mike Hinge.

At that point, in 1975, Warner approached local comic book store owner Joe Sarno and his associate Mike Gold to produce the show. Their job was to overcome Chicago's reputation of being a sub-par convention city. Early in the process, George Hagenauer and comics retailer Larry Charet were brought in. Although Sarno wanted to name the show the Chicago Comic Art and Nostalgia Convention, he was voted down and the name Chicago Comicon was adopted.

The first Chicago Comicon was held in the Playboy Towers Hotel on August 6–8, 1976. Special guests were Marvel Comics figurehead Stan Lee, DC Comics president Jenette Kahn, seminal cartoonist/editor Harvey Kurtzman, artist Mike Grell, and illustrator Tim Conrad. The show featured a comic auction benefiting Chicago's Alternative Schools Network (later auctions benefited the Literacy Volunteers of Chicago). The first Chicago Comicon attracted 2,100 attendees.

In 1977, the Chicago Comicon moved back to the Pick-Congress Hotel, on 520 S. Michigan Avenue (the location of the 1973 show), where it remained until 1983. (The Pick-Congress was renamed the Americana-Congress Hotel in 1982.) The producers added Bob Weinberg to help coordinate the 1977 show. Attendance reached 3,000 at an admission charge of $3/day. The 1978 show was dubbed "Sweatcon" because of the extreme heat. The 1979 show was produced by Larry Charet and Bob Weinberg; it was the first year that Joe Sarno was not one of the show's organizers. Admission was $3.50/day.

Show organizers hosted a "Chicago Minicon" on April 26–27, 1980, at the usual location of the Pick-Congress Hotel; guests included John Byrne, Max Allan Collins, Tim Conrad, Mike Grell, Paul Kupperberg, and Marv Wolfman. By 1980, the feature show admission was $4/day, and by 1982, it had gone up to $5/day. Will Eisner was the show's guest of honor for 1981 but was unable to attend due to an accident. He returned in 1982 as the guest of honor, which was the same year that the Chicago Comicon merged with Panopticon West, a Doctor Who convention. Again because of overwhelming heat it was dubbed "Sweatcon II."

The Comicon was expanding, and in 1983 the show moved to the larger venue, the Ramada O'Hare Hotel in Rosemont, Illinois, a northern suburb. That location was the show's home until 1993 when it relocated to the Rosemont Convention Center (now known as the Donald E. Stephens Convention Center), where it has remained ever since. During the mid-1980s, the show organizers hosted annual one-day "Minicons" every December.

The 1985 program booklet celebrated Marvel Comics' 25th anniversary, followed by the 1987 program celebrating Chicago-based First Comics' 5th anniversary, 1988's booklet marking Eclipse Comics' 10th anniversary, and the 1989 program noted Kitchen Sink Press' 20th anniversary. The 1988 show featured the inaugural presentation of the Harvey Awards. One-day admission for the 1988 comicon was $6. The 1989 show focused on Batman, due to the popularity of Tim Burton's Batman movie. It also featured a panel on underground comics that included Harvey Pekar, Jay Lynch, Skip Williamson, and S. Clay Wilson. One-day tickets for the 1989 show were $7.

The 1992 Chicago Comicon celebrated the "spirits of independence", e.g. the hot-selling group of creators behind Image Comics. Rob Liefeld held a 24-hour autograph session from Friday morning to Saturday morning. The 1992 show featured 200 dealers, and attendees were charged $10 per person or $25 for a three-day pass.

The 1994 show featured fifty publishers and 300 dealers; it also hosted the Comics Arts Conference.

By 1995, the comics industry was in a slump, and attendance at the show was decreasing. By then, the convention ownership included Charet, while the main show organizer was Moondog Comics owner Gary Colabuono. The 1995 Comicon featured a Stan Lee roast, and again hosted the Comics Arts Conference.

In 1996, the Chicago Comicon became the new home of the Wizard World Fan Awards, which were presented at the show every year until their discontinuation in 2006.

Wizard Entertainment bought the Chicago Comicon from Charet and his partners in 1997. By the 1997 show, attendance was topping out at 5,000; Wizard's first order of business was to  fire the previous organizers.

With the 1998 show, now renamed Wizard World Chicago, attendance jumped to 25,000, at a charge of $20 per day or $40 for three days. The 1999 show featured 750 exhibitors.

The 2001 show featured exhibitors like DC, Marvel, Hasbro, and Bandai, and charged attendees $20/day or $40 for the weekend.

By 2006, Wizard World Chicago had expanded to four days and boasted a weekend attendance of over 58,000 people. The 2009 show attracted 70,000 attendees, but neither DC Comics nor Marvel Comics had an official presence at the show.

Disgraced former Illinois governor Rod Blagojevich made an appearance at the 2010 Wizard World Chicago, conversing with and taking pictures with attendants. He charged $50 for an autograph and $80 for a photo. He also had a humorous televised meeting with Adam West; Blagojevich remarked that he considered The Joker to be the best Batman foil. Comic fandom website bleedingcool.com reported that Blagojevich met with a mostly positive reception, while Time Out Chicago described it as mixed.

The 2011 show charged $35 for a one-day pass and $60 for a four-day pass at the door.

The 2020 show, scheduled for August 20–23, was cancelled due to the COVID-19 pandemic. The next show was scheduled for June 24–27, 2021. The convention was postponed to October 2021 due to COVID-19, while Wizard Entertainment's conventions were sold to Informa's Fan Expo unit in August, and rebranded accordingly beginning in 2022.

Dates and locations

Criticism and competition
By 2009, criticism of Wizard World Chicago had been mounting for a while, particularly from those who resented the show's declining emphasis on the traditional comics market and more on things like professional wrestlers and old TV shows. In addition, local dealers resented the show's location outside of Chicago's city limits and its high exhibition prices. The 2009 show, for the first time, had no representation from major publishers like DC and Marvel. According to Deanna Isaacs  of Chicago Reader, this was those published opted instead to appear at the competitor convention Reed Exhibition's Chicago Comic & Entertainment Expo (C2E2), which challenged Wizard World Chicago's position as Chicago's only major comic convention in 2010.

References

External links 

 
 "Blast from the Past: Chicago Comic-Con posters", Comics Buyer's Guide #1661 (January 2010)
 "Chicago Comicon memories: 1976-1989," Comics Buyer's Guide website (Apr. 14, 2010)

Comics conventions in the United States
Multigenre conventions
Gaming conventions
Science fiction conventions in the United States
Recurring events established in 1972
Festivals in Chicago
Culture of Chicago
Tourist attractions in Chicago
1972 establishments in Illinois
Conventions in Illinois